= Daulatpur Thikriya =

- village
- Location within Madhya Pradesh Location within India
- Coordinates: 23.3658591°N 77.2491365°E
- Country: India
- State: Madhya Pradesh
- District: Bhopal
- Tehsil: Huzur
- Elevation: 516 m (1,693 ft)

Population (2011)
  - Total: 222
- Time zone: UTC+5:30 (IST)
- ISO 3166 code: MP-IN
- 2011 census code: 482347

Daulatpur Thikriya is a village in the Bhopal district of Madhya Pradesh, India. It is located in the Huzur tehsil and the Phanda block.

== Demographics ==
According to the 2011 census of India, Daulatpur Thikriya has 51 households. The effective literacy rate (i.e. the literacy rate of population excluding children aged 6 and below) is 60.33%.

Demographics (2011 Census)
	Total	Male	Female
Population	222	121	101
Children aged below 6 years	38	22	16
Scheduled caste	16	7	9
Scheduled tribe	0	0	0
Literates	111	71	40
Workers (all)	119	69	50
Main workers (total)	54	49	5
Main workers: Cultivators	16	16	0
Main workers: Agricultural labourers	24	22	2
Main workers: Household industry workers	2	1	1
Main workers: Other	12	10	2
Marginal workers (total)	65	20	45
Marginal workers: Cultivators	21	4	17
Marginal workers: Agricultural labourers	33	12	21
Marginal workers: Household industry workers	0	0	0
Marginal workers: Others	11	4	7
Non-workers	103	52	51
